Prevail is the ninth studio album by Canadian death metal band Kataklysm, released May 23, 2008 in Europe and June 6, 2008 in North America. Music videos were filmed for the tracks "Taking The World By Storm" and "Blood in Heaven".

Track listing

A bonus DVD was included containing the "Taking the World by Storm" video, a photo gallery and a live performance in December 2007 at DeepRockDrive studios in Las Vegas. The songs were voted for by fans watching the performance online.

Bass player Stéphane Barbe was replaced by François Mongrain from the band Martyr for the performance, as he was home for the birth of his daughter.

Personnel
Kataklysm
Maurizio Iacono - Vocals
Jean-François Dagenais - Guitar
François Mongrain - Bass
Max Duhamel - Drums

Guest musicians
Pat O'Brien (Cannibal Corpse) - Guitars
Dave Linsk (Overkill) - Guitars
Jason Suecof - Guitars

Production
Jean-François Dagenais - Producer, Engineering
Jason Suecof - Mixing
Mark Lewis - Engineering
Alan Douches - Mastering, Engineering
Pascal Laquerre - Cover art

References

2008 albums
Kataklysm albums
Nuclear Blast albums